Sydney Vincent Conlon (9 October 1898 – 22 May 1950) was an Australian rules footballer who played with South Melbourne in the Victorian Football League (VFL).

Notes

External links 

1898 births
1950 deaths
Australian rules footballers from Victoria (Australia)
Sydney Swans players
Australian military personnel of World War I